Good-for-Nothing is a 1922 German silent film directed by Carl Froelich based on the novella by Joseph von Eichendorff. and starring Erhard Siedel, Julia Serda and Valerie von Martens. e It premiered on 1 September 1922 at the  in Berlin.

Cast
 Erhard Siedel 
 Julia Serda
 Valerie von Martens 
 Gustav Waldau
 Hans Junkermann 
 Hans Thimig

References

External links

1922 films
Films of the Weimar Republic
Films directed by Carl Froelich
German silent feature films
Films produced by Erich Pommer
German black-and-white films
Films based on German novels
UFA GmbH films
Adaptations of works by Joseph von Eichendorff